Matic Ivačič (born 8 September 1993) is a motorcycle speedway rider from Slovenia.

Honours 
In 2020, Ivačič became the Slovenian National Champion after winning the Slovenian Individual Speedway Championship, which ended the 18 year reign of Matej Žagar. Ivačič had previously won the silver medal behind Žagar in 2018 and 2019.
 In 2021, he became the Slovenia-Slovakia-Hungary National Champion.

He has won the Slovenian Championship again in 2021 and 2022.

Career Details

National Championships 
 Slovenian Individual Speedway Championship
 2020 - 1st Place

 Slovenia-Slovakia-Hungary National Championship
  Debrecen 2021 - 1st Place

SGP Appearances  
  Krsko (30 April 2016) - did not start (reserve)
  Krsko (7 September 2019) - 16th place (wild card)
  Krsko (1 June 2019) - 16th place (wild card)

References 

1993 births
Living people
Slovenian speedway riders
People from Brežice